Michael Reed Barratt (born April 16, 1959) is an American physician and a NASA astronaut. Specializing in aerospace medicine, he served as a flight surgeon for NASA before his selection as an astronaut, and has played a role in developing NASA's space medicine programs for both the Shuttle-Mir Program and International Space Station. His first spaceflight was a long-duration mission to the International Space Station, as a flight engineer in the Expedition 19 and 20 crew. In March 2011, Barratt completed his second spaceflight as a crew member of STS-133.

Personal
Born in Vancouver, Washington, Barratt considers Camas, Washington, to be his home town. He is married to Dr. Michelle Lynne Barratt (née Sasynuik); they reside in League City, Texas, and have five children. His father and mother, Joseph and Donna Barratt, reside in Camas. His personal and recreational interests include family and church activities, writing, sailing, and boat restoration and maintenance.

Education
Barratt graduated from Camas High School in 1977. He graduated from the University of Washington in 1981 with a Bachelor of Science degree in zoology, going on to earn an M.D. from Northwestern University in 1985. He completed a three-year residency in internal medicine at Northwestern University in 1988; his Chief Residency year was at Veterans Administration Lakeside Hospital in Chicago in 1989. In 1991, Barratt completed both a residency and a Master of Science in aerospace medicine jointly run by Wright State University, NASA, and Wright-Patterson Air Force Base. He is board certified in Internal and Aerospace Medicine.

Barratt holds a private pilot's license and has been qualified on NASA's T-38 Talons.

NASA career
Barratt first worked at NASA Johnson Space Center in May 1991, employed as an aerospace project physician with KRUG Life Sciences. From May 1991 to July 1992, he served on the Health Maintenance Facility Project as manager of the Hyperbaric and Respiratory Subsystems for the defunct Space Station Freedom project. In July 1992 he was assigned as NASA aviation medical examiner working in Space Shuttle Medical Operations.

In July 1993 Barratt was one of a team of the first three Americans invited to witness the recovery of a Soyuz spacecraft. Asked to help evaluate the potential of the Soyuz as a Crew Return Vehicle for a NASA space station, he flew with the recovery team that picked up the crew of Soyuz TM-16 after they landed in Kazakhstan. (The Soyuz was ultimately chosen as the return vehicle for the International Space Station).

In January 1994 he was assigned to the Shuttle-Mir Program. He spent over 12 months working and training in the Gagarin Cosmonaut Training Center at Star City as one of two flight surgeons supporting Norman Thagard and his backup Bonnie Dunbar, a role that often included negotiations to resolve different approaches to medicine by NASA and Russian doctors. Barratt and fellow flight surgeon David Ward developed a Mir Supplemental Medical Kit to augment Russian equipment on Mir and developed a program of training for its use, taught to both NASA astronauts and Russian cosmonauts.

Thagard launched to Mir aboard Soyuz TM-21 and returned to earth on STS-71; during the 115-day flight, Barratt and Ward effectively served as a CAPCOMs for the NASA Shuttle-Mir team in addition to their duties as flight surgeons.

From July 1995 through July 1998, Barratt served as Medical Operations Lead for the International Space Station (ISS). A frequent traveler to Russia, he worked with counterparts at Star City and the Institute of Biomedical Problems as well as other ISS partner centers, developing medical procedures, training and equipment for ISS. Barratt served as lead crew surgeon for ISS Expedition 1 from July 1998 until selected as an astronaut candidate. He serves as Associate Editor for Space Medicine for the journal Aviation, Space, and Environmental Medicine, and is senior editor of the textbook Principles of Clinical Medicine for Space Flight.

Selected as a mission specialist by NASA in July 2000, Barratt reported for training in August 2000. Following the completion of two years of training and evaluation, he was assigned technical duties in the Astronaut Office Station Operations Branch.

NEEMO 7 

In October 2004, Barratt served as an aquanaut during the NEEMO 7 mission aboard the Aquarius underwater laboratory, living and working underwater for eleven days. During NEEMO 7 the crew tested technologies and procedures for remote surgery, as well as using virtual reality for telemedicine.

Expedition 19/20

Barratt was assigned to the Expedition 19 crew in February 2008 and launched to the International Space Station in March 2009 aboard Soyuz TMA-14. His stay aboard the ISS continued through until the end of Expedition 20 in October 2009.

During Expedition 20 Barratt performed and EVA and IVA together with Gennady Padalka. The first EVA, on June 5, 2009, lasted for 4 hours and 54 minutes, Prepared the Zvezda service module transfer compartment for the arrival of the Poisk module, installed docking antenna for the module, photographed antenna for evaluation on the ground, and photographed the Strela-2 crane.
The second was an internal spacewalk in the depressurised Zvezda transfer compartment, to replace one of the Zvezda hatches with a docking cone, in preparation for the docking of the Poisk module later in 2009. This spacewalk lasted 12 minutes.

Barratt returned to Earth on October 11, 2009, after spending 198 days, 16 hours and 42 minutes in space., on Soyuz TMA-14 along with Padalka and space tourist Guy Laliberté.

STS-133

Barratt flew as a mission specialist on STS-133, the final flight of Space Shuttle Discovery. The mission launched on February 24, 2011, and landed on March 9, 2011. The mission transported several items to the space station, including the Permanent Multipurpose Module Leonardo, which was left permanently docked to one of the station's ports. The shuttle also carried the third of four ExPRESS Logistics Carriers to the ISS, as well as a humanoid robot called Robonaut.  During the mission Barratt was in charge of the robotics activities in the station. Total duration of STS-133 was 12 days, 19 hours and 4 minutes.

Post-spaceflights
From January 2012 through April 2013, Barratt was manager of the Human Research Program at NASA Johnson Space Center, researching the health and performance risks associated with long-duration human spaceflight and mitigating them.

In 2013, Barratt served as cavenaut into the ESA CAVES training in Sardinia, alongside Jeremy Hansen, Satoshi Furukawa, Jack Fisher, Aleksei Ovchinin and Paolo Nespoli.

As of 2018, Barratt is involved with the human missions to Mars, and dealing with the health risks of the spaceflight to Mars, especially the risks from cosmic radiation.

Organizations
Aerospace Medical Association; American College of Physicians; Alpha Omega Alpha Medical Honor Society; American Institute for the Advancement of Science.

Awards and honors
Barratt has received several awards and honors:
Hubertus Strughold Award, 2011
W. Randolph Lovelace Award (1998), Society of NASA Flight Surgeons
Rotary National Award for Space Achievement Foundation Nominee (1998)
Melbourne W. Boynton Award (1995), American Astronautical Society
USAF Flight Surgeons Julian Ward Award (1992)
Wright State University Outstanding Graduate Student, Aerospace Medicine (1991)
Alpha Omega Alpha Medical Honor Society, Northwestern University Medical School, Chicago, IL (1988)
Phi Beta Kappa, University of Washington, Seattle, WA (1981)

References

External links

 Spacefacts biography of Michael R. Barratt
 Space Medicine, EVAs, ISS and The Right Stuff: NASA Astronaut and Physician, Dr. Michael Barratt PeerSpectrum Medical Podcast, July 26, 2018
 Star Trek: The Real Doctor McCoy
 In Their Own Words: Astronaut Mike Barratt Nasa Kennedy Space Center YouTube channel, June 17, 2011
 Earth from Space: Interactive Astronaut Panel, Michael Barratt, Jean-Jacques Favier, Thomas Marshburn, Donald A. Thomas, the 13th Ilan Ramon International Space Conference, February 2018

1959 births
Living people
Aquanauts
Crew members of the International Space Station
People from Vancouver, Washington
Physician astronauts
University of Washington College of Arts and Sciences alumni
Wright State University alumni
NASA civilian astronauts
People from Camas, Washington
Feinberg School of Medicine alumni
Space Shuttle program astronauts
Spacewalkers